Secular Culture & Ideas is a web journal about Jewish culture, literature, and thought. Founded in 2007, it was originally part of JBooks.com although it now maintains its own website . The journal’s tag line is, “rethinking Jewish.”

Among the popular pieces published on Secular Culture & Ideas are interviews with Tony Kushner, Natalie Angier, and A.B. Yehoshua, and reviews of books by Jonathan Sarna and Susan Jacoby. The website features an articles section, and a blog, “News & Notes.” A special book section, “Bookshelf,” was introduced in 2011.

Secular Culture & Ideas is supported by the Posen Foundation, a non-profit that works internationally to promote Jewish culture and support Jewish education. Secular Culture & Ideas expanded its culture coverage in the summer of 2011 with its new section “Culture Currents.”

Contributors
Its contributors have included...

Aaron David Gordon, Rebecca Goldstein, Lawrence S. Wittner, Rachel Elior, Susan Jacoby, Paul Kurtz, Chaim Zhitlowsky, Michel Abitbol, Yuri Slezkine, Yaakov Malkin, Alan Dershowitz, Douglas Rushkoff, Natalie Angier, Rebecca Alpert, Ilan Stavans, Rodger Kamenetz, Alicia Ostriker, Yehuda Amichai, Chana Bloch, David G. Roskies, Michael Wex, Richard Chess, Nahma Sandrow, Tony Kushner, Irena Klepfisz, Aaron Lansky, Paul Buhle, Deborah Dash Moore, Peter Cole and Sherwin Wine.

Past issues 
 Secular Jewish Pioneers, March 2010
 Jewish Studies, March 2010
 New Books, December 2010
 Expressions of Jewish Secularisms, November 2008
 Back-to-School, September 2008
 Jewish Languages, June 2008
 Sephardic and Mizrahi Secularisms, January 2008
 Memoirs, November 2007
 Making Judaism Modern, September 2007
 Renaissance of Yiddish, June 2007

Topics of interest 
 Roots of Secularisms
 Secular Thinkers
 Contemporary Topics
 Literature & Arts
 Holidays & Life-Cycle

See also
Center for Cultural Judaism

References

Further reading 
 Center for Cultural Judaism, "Secular Culture & Ideas Debuts on Jbooks.com in Collaboration with the Posen Foundation," June, 2007

External links 
 
 Posen Foundation web site
 Posen Foundation-Israel web site
 American Jewish Identification Survey
 Jewish Books - The Largest Online Provider Of Hebrew Sifrei Kodesh. Seforim,Sefer,Jewish Books,Kabbalah,Kabalah,Sforim.

Jewish culture
Jewish websites
Secular Jewish culture
Internet properties established in 2007